Sneh is a given name and surname. Notable persons with that name include:

Surname 
Efraim Sneh (born 1944), Israeli politician and physician
Moshe Sneh (1909–1972), Israeli politician and military figure

Given name 
Sneh Bhargava (born 1930), Indian radiologist and medical academic
Sneh Chousurin (born 1952), Thai fencer
Sneh Rana (cricketer) (born 1984), Indian cricketer
Sneh Rana (born 1994), Nepalese sports shooter
Sneh Wongchaoom (born 1934), Thai sprinter